Bharti Enterprises Limited is an Indian multinational conglomerate, headquartered in Delhi. It was founded in 1976 by Sunil Mittal. Bharti Enterprises owns businesses spanning across manufacturing, telecommunications, agribusiness, real estate, hospitality, agri and food. The group's flagship company, Bharti Airtel, is a telecom service provider with operations in more than 18 countries across Asia, North America, Africa & Europe. The company ranks amongst the top two mobile network operators globally in terms of subscribers.

History
The company was founded by Sunil Bharti Mittal with his two siblings in 1976. The company initially started manufacturing bicycles before diversifying into other sectors. It entered into telecommunications industry in 1995.

Companies

Bharti is present in many sectors with the largest revenue contribution coming from the telecom industry.

Bharti Airtel

Bharti Telecom (BTL), is a holding company of Bharti Airtel with Bharti Enterprises and SingTel owning 50.56 percent and 49.44 percent, respectively, in BTL, which in turn owns 35.80 percent of Bharti Airtel.

Bharti Airtel is the third largest mobile operator in the world, in subscriber base, and has a presence across 18 countries. The company is India's second largest integrated telecom company in customer base and offers mobile, fixed line, high speed home broadband, M-commerce, DTH and enterprise service.

Bharti Infratel

In India, Bharti Infratel owns over 38,500 towers across 11 circles. It plans to spend 1,086 crore to set up 4,813 new towers. Bharti Infratel also has a 42% stake in Indus towers.

Brightstar Telecommunications India Ltd
Brightstar Telecommunications India Ltd is India's leading telecom and allied products company. It is one of the world's largest manufacturers of land-line telephones. With a strong distribution network across the country, the company is the primary distributor of IT and telecom products from international brands such as RAD, Huawei, Radwin, Polycom, SonicWall, and Accops.

Field Fresh Foods
Field Fresh Foods is a joint venture between Bharti Enterprises and DMPL India Ltd. (a subsidiary of Del Monte Pacific Ltd.). The company offers fresh fruits and vegetables and processed foods and beverages in the domestic and international markets.

Centum Learning
Centum Learning (formerly Bharti Learning Systems Limited), is a wholly owned subsidiary of Bharti Enterprises.

Bharti Realty
Bharti Realty is the in-house real estate arm for Bharti Group and facilitates by extending support to the Group Companies for identifying, developing and maintaining real estate.

OneWeb

A 50% stake in OneWeb was acquired in July 2020, being a joint venture with the UK Government.

Group's Philanthropic Initiatives

Bharti Foundation is the philanthropic arm of Bharti Enterprises. The Foundation has established schools in villages across India and offers free quality education with free books, uniform and mid day meals to poor children.
Satya Bharti School Program' – the Foundation's flagship program is running 254 schools in six States serving over 45,000 rural children, free of cost. The other educational initiatives including the – Satya Bharti School, Quality Support and Learning Centre Programs, are currently reaching out to over 350,000 underprivileged children in 16 states. Other Program of the Foundation making considerable impact among the underprivileged sections is – 'Satya Bharti Abhiyan' (Sanitation).

In 2017, the Bharti Family pledged 10% of wealth (approx. Rs 70 billion) towards Philanthropy to set up Satya Bharti University, a world-class University to offer education to deserving youth from economically weaker sections of society.

Former companies

Bharti Walmart
Bharti Enterprises tied-up with Walmart for opening a chain of retail stores all over India. The companies, in August 2007, made a surprise statement that they have signed a wholesale cash-and-carry deal. The first Best Price Modern Wholesale opened in Amritsar in May 2010. This partnership has now ended.

Bharti AXA General Insurance and Life Insurance
Bharti AXA General Insurance Company Limited was a joint venture between Bharti Enterprises and AXA. The joint venture company had a 51% stake from Bharti Enterprises and 49% stake of the AXA Group. They had PAN India presence through 135 branches.

On 8 September, Bharti AXA General Insurance was merged into ICICI Lombard General Insurance.

References

Companies based in Delhi
Conglomerate companies established in 1976
Multinational companies headquartered in India
Indian companies established in 1976
Bharti Enterprises
1976 establishments in Delhi